Žarko Milaković (born March 3, 1982) is a Bosnian professional basketball coach.

Coaching career
Milaković started his coaching in 2007. In the first few years he coached U16 and U18 teams in Banja Luka. In 2014, he became the youth coach for the Igokea. Also, he coached Kozara Gradiška and Student Igokea of the First Republika Srpska League. In 2018, he won the Republika Srpska Cup with Student Igokea.

On April 2, 2018, Milaković became a head coach for Igokea. In July 2018, he became an assistant coach for Igokea, after Nenad Trajković had named as the Igokea head coach. He parted ways with Igokea in December 2018.

National teams 
Milaković was an assistant coach of the U20 Serbia national team at the 2016 FIBA U20 European Championship in Helsinki, Finland.

Milaković was an assistant coach of the U18 Serbia national team that won the gold medal at the 2018 FIBA U18 European Championship in Latvia.

References

External links 
 Profile at eurobasket.com
 
 ABA League Profile

1982 births
Living people
Bosnia and Herzegovina basketball coaches
Bosnia and Herzegovina expatriate basketball people in Serbia
KK Igokea coaches
Serbs of Bosnia and Herzegovina
Sportspeople from Banja Luka